Aidan Kearney may refer to:

 Aidan Kearney (hurler)
 Aidan Kearney (rugby union)